was an officer and ace fighter pilot in the Imperial Japanese Navy during World War II.  Participating in many of the Pacific War battles and campaigns as a member of several units, including the fighter units of the aircraft carriers Shōkaku and Chiyoda, Kodaira was officially credited with destroying 13 enemy aircraft.  After the war, he served with the Japan Air Self-Defense Force. In 2008, Tsubasa-kai ("Wings Association"), the veterans' organization of the JASDF, reported his death on its website.

References

1918 births
2008 deaths
Japan Air Self-Defense Force personnel
Japanese naval aviators
Japanese World War II flying aces
People from Nagano Prefecture
Imperial Japanese Navy officers